Gaylussacia baccata, the black huckleberry, is a common huckleberry found throughout a wide area of eastern North America.

Distribution
The plant is native to Eastern Canada and the Great Lakes region, the Midwestern and Northeastern United States, and the Appalachian Mountains, the Ohio/Mississippi/Tennessee Valley, and Southeastern United States. The range extends from Newfoundland west to Manitoba and Minnesota, south as far as Arkansas, Alabama, and Georgia.

Description
Gaylussacia baccata closely resembles the native blueberry plants (Vaccinium species) with which it grows in the same habitats. However, it can be readily identified by the numerous resin dots on the undersides of the leaves which glitter when held up to the light.  Gaylussacia baccata is a shrub up to 150 cm (5 feet) tall, forming extensive colonies. Flowers are in dangling groups of 3–7, orange or red, bell-shaped. Berries are dark blue, almost black, rarely white.

Berries are sweet and tasty. People and animals eat them raw, jellied, or baked into pancakes, muffins, and many other items.

Ecology
It is a larval host to the brown elfin, Gordian sphinx, Henry's elfin, and huckleberry sphinx.

See also
Vaccinium membranaceum — with "black huckleberry" as common name also.

References

External links
Photo of herbarium specimen at Missouri Botanical Garden, collected in Maryland in 1966

baccata
Berries
Flora of North America
Plants described in 1787
Edible plants